The Peninsula Pilots was a primary name of the Minor League Baseball franchise located in Hampton, Virginia from 1963–1992. The Pilots played in the Class A Carolina League.

Today, Peninsula is home to the summer collegiate baseball team who have adopted the same Peninsula Pilots moniker and are members of the Coastal Plain League.

History
The Peninsula Pilots franchise began play in the Carolina League in 1963 as a Washington Senators farm team.

The franchise had many monikers, playing as the Peninsula Senators (1963), Peninsula Grays (1964–1968), Peninsula Astros (1969), Peninsula Phillies (1970–71), Peninsula Whips (1972–1973), Peninsula Pennants (1974), Peninsula Pilots (1976–1985), Peninsula White Sox (1986-1987), Virginia Generals (1988) and Peninsula Pilots (1976–1985, 1989–1992). The teams were members of the Class A Carolina League (1963–1971), Class AAA International League (1972–1973) and Class A Carolina League (1974–1992).

Peninsula teams were an affiliate of the  Washington Senators (1963), Cincinnati Reds (1964–1966), Kansas City Athletics (1967), Oakland Athletics (1968), Houston Astros (1969), Philadelphia Phillies (1970–1971), Montreal Expos (1972–1973), Philadelphia Phillies (1976–1985), Chicago White Sox (1986–1987) and Seattle Mariners (1990–1992).

Baseball Hall of Fame inductees Johnny Bench (1966), Gary Carter (1973) and Satchel Paige (1966) played for Peninsula.

The 1980 team was named the 74th best Minor League team of the 20th century in a list by two noted minor league historians, Bill Weiss and Marshall Wright. The team was known as the Peninsula Senators (1963), Grays (1964–1968), Astros (1969), Phillies (1970–71), Whips (1972–1973), Pennants (1974) and White Sox in 19861987 while affiliated with the Chicago White Sox, and as the Virginia Generals in 1988 when they operated as an unaffiliated co-op club. They regained their original name in 1989 and major league affiliation returned in 1990 with the Seattle Mariners (19901992). The team's existence ended after the 1992 season when they relocated to Wilmington, Delaware and became the Wilmington Blue Rocks.

The ballpark
Peninsula teams played at War Memorial Stadium (1963-1992). Built in 1948, the ballpark is still in use today and is located at 1889 West Pembroke Avenue, Hampton, Virginia, 23661. Today, War Memorial Stadium is home to the summer collegiate baseball team with the same Peninsula Pilots moniker who play in the Coastal Plain League.

War Memorial Stadium was first built by Branch Rickey for the Newport News Dodgers, who played at War Memorial from 1948-1958 as members of the Piedmont League. The ballpark has also been known as Peninsula Stadium.

Notable Peninsula alumni

Baseball Hall of Fame alumni
 Johnny Bench (1966) Inducted, 1989
 Gary Carter (1973) Inducted, 2003
 Satchel Paige (1966) Inducted, 1971

Notable Peninsula alumni
 Bret Boone (1990) 3x MLB All-Star; 
 Bernie Carbo (1966)
 Cesar Cedeno (1969) 4x MLB All-Star
 Darren Daulton (1982) 3x MLB All-Star; Philadelphia Phillies Wall of Fame
 Bob Dernier (1979)
 Jim Essian (1971)
 Darrell Evans (1967) 2x MLB All-Star; 1985 AL Home Run Leader; San Francisco Giants Wall of Fame
 Ken Forsch (1969) 2x MLB All-Star
 Julio Franco (1980) 3x MLB All-Star; 1991 AL Batting Title
 Craig Grebeck (1987)
 Cliff Johnson (1969)
 Mike LaValliere (1982)
 Skip Lockwood (1968)
 Hal McRae (1966) 3x MLB All-Star; Kansas City Royals Hall of Fame
 Mike Maddux (1983)
 Steve Mingori (1965–1966)
 Jeff Nelson (1990) MLB All-Star
 Scott Radinsky (1987)
 Steve Rogers (1972) 5x MLB All-Star; 1977 NL ERA Leader
 Juan Samuel (1982) 3x MLB All-Star
 Gene Tenace (1967) MLB All-Star
 Andre Thornton (1970) 2x MLB All-Star; Roberto Clemente Award (1979); Cleveland Indians Hall of Fame
 Bob Walk (1977) MLB All-Star

Year-by-Year Record

See also
Peninsula Pilots, an amateur baseball team in the Coastal Plain League, a collegiate summer baseball league

References

Defunct Carolina League teams
Philadelphia Phillies minor league affiliates
Chicago White Sox minor league affiliates
Seattle Mariners minor league affiliates
Defunct baseball teams in Virginia
Sports in Hampton, Virginia
Washington Senators minor league affiliates
Cincinnati Reds minor league affiliates
Kansas City Athletics minor league affiliates
Minnesota Twins minor league affiliates
Oakland Athletics minor league affiliates
Houston Astros minor league affiliates
Montreal Expos minor league affiliates
Washington Nationals minor league affiliates
Defunct International League teams
Baseball teams established in 1963
Baseball teams disestablished in 1992
1963 establishments in Virginia
1992 disestablishments in Virginia
Sports in Hampton Roads